Firsat Sofi Ali (21 May 1978 – 18 November 2020) was an Iraqi Kurdish politician of the Kurdistan Democratic Party (KDP).

Biography
He was born in Gazna village in Choman District. Firsat was the Governor of Erbil until he died due to COVID-19 on 18 November 2020.

Sofi held a PhD in International Law from Salahaddin University and taught law at Erbil's Polytechnic University. He was also a legal advisor at the Kurdistan Region Presidency’s office.

Sofi contracted Coronavirus on October 19 and was flown to Turkey for medical treatment in Istanbul's Memorial hospital on November 2. Following his death, President Nechirvan Barzani offered condolences to Sofi's family, describing him as "an active parliamentarian and competent legal expert who had a significant role in the Kurdistan Parliament." Barzani added that "His professionalism, integrity, patriotism, and devotion has made Dr. Firsat much loved by the public."

After his death, Omed Khoshnaw become new governor of Erbil.

References 

1978 births
2020 deaths
Iraqi Kurdistani politicians
Kurdistan Democratic Party politicians
Members of the Kurdistan Region Parliament
People from Erbil Governorate
Governors of Erbil Governorate
Salahaddin University-Erbil alumni
Deaths from the COVID-19 pandemic in Turkey